Alexander Martin (28 December 1864 – 26 October 1951) was a sports shooter. He represented Canada in the 1000 yard free rifle event at the 1908 Summer Olympics.

His brother John Martin represented Great Britain at the same Olympics and won a silver medal.

References

1864 births
1951 deaths
Canadian male sport shooters
Olympic shooters of Canada
Shooters at the 1908 Summer Olympics
Place of birth missing